Events from the year 1662 in art.

Events
 (unknown)

Paintings

Philippe de Champaigne – Ex-Voto de 1662
Rembrandt
The Conspiracy of Claudius Civilis (1661–1662)
The Sampling Officials (Rijksmuseum Amsterdam)
Samuel Dirksz van Hoogstraten – View Through a House (Dyrham Park)

Births
January - Michiel Maddersteg, Dutch painter (died 1708)
February 9 - Paolo de Matteis, Italian painter working for the Spanish Viceroy of Naples (died 1728)
May - Jan Frans van Bloemen, Flemish landscape painter (died 1740)
June 3 - Willem Van Mieris, Dutch painter from Leyden (died 1747)
July 20 - Andrea Brustolon, Italian sculptor in wood (died 1732)
August 10 - Charles Boit, Swedish painter in vitreous enamels (died 1727)
November 23 - Clemente de Torres, Spanish Baroque painter of Genoese origin (died 1730)
 date unknown
Panagiotis Doxaras, Greek painter who founded the Heptanese School of Greek art (died 1729)
Gaspard Duchange, French engraver (died 1757)
Perpète Evrard, Flemish painter of portraits and miniatures (died 1727)
Pierre Gobert, French painter (died 1744)
Joseph Christophe (or Christophle), French artist (died 1748)
André Jean, French artist (died 1753)
Giuseppe Antonio Torricelli, Italian sculptor and gem-engraver of the late Baroque, active in Florence (died 1719)
Girolamo Ruggieri, Italian painter of landscapes and battle paintings (died 1717)
Teresa Scannabecchi, Italian woman painter active in Bologna (died 1708)
Giuseppe Tortelli, Italian painter, active in Brescia (date of death unknown)

Deaths
June - Johannes Cornelisz Verspronck, Dutch portraitist (born 1600/1603)
July - Pieter Holsteyn I, Dutch Golden Age painter, engraver and stained glass worker (born 1585)
July 10 - Jan Jansz van de Velde, Dutch Golden Age painter (born 1620)
September 21 - Adriaan van Stalbemt, Flemish painter (born 1580)
November 12 - Adriaen van de Venne, Dutch Baroque painter of allegories, genre subjects and portraits (born 1589)
date unknown
Georg Baresch, German antique collector (born 1585)
Giovanni Francesco Romanelli, Italian painter of frescoes (born 1610)
Vincenzo Spisanelli, Italian painter of altarpieces (born 1595)
Adriaen van Eemont, Dutch Golden Age painter (born 1626)
probable
Francisco Lopez Caro, Spanish painter (born 1578)
Carlo Francesco Nuvolone, Italian painter (born c.1609)
Anthonie Jansz. van der Croos, Dutch painter (born c.1606)
Jacob Vrel, Dutch painter (born c.1630)

 
Years of the 17th century in art
1660s in art